Paroedura karstophila is a species of lizard in the family Gekkonidae.It is described from Montagne des Français, a karstic limestone 
massif in the far north of Madagascar recently established as nature reserve. The new 
species has the nostril in contact with the rostral scale and shares many characters with 
P. karstophila and especially with P. homalorhina which are also restricted to karstic 
habitats. Paroedura hordiesi differs from P. karstophila by a smoother skin on dorsum 
and legs, by original and regenerated tails being both entirely smooth, by colouration, 
and by larger snout-vent length. Morphologically the new species is most similar to P. 
homalorhina from the Ankarana reserve from which it can be distinguished by shorter 
limbs and a less slender habitus. Published molecular data place the new species as close 
relative of P. homalorhina and another undescribed species from Nosy Hara Island, while 
newly determined data of the cox1 gene for P. karstophila confirm the distinctness of 
the new species from this taxon. Integrating the information from published and novel 
molecular data, the new species differs from all nominal Paroedura (except P. vahiny for 
which no molecular data are available to date) by strong genetic divergences. P. hordiesi
might be another microendemic species of the Montagne des Français region. We suggest 
its IUCN Red List classification as “Critically Endangered” on the basis that it has an 
extent of occurrence of at most 50 km², it is known from a single location, and there is a 
continuing decline in the extent and quality of its habitat. It is endemic to Madagascar.

References

Paroedura
Reptiles of Madagascar
Reptiles described in 2000